Metropolitan Iziasłaŭ (born Ivan Daniłavič Brucki) (22 January 1926 – 26 November 2007) was the primate of the Belarusian Autocephalous Orthodox Church.

Ivan Brucki was born in a wealthy farmer's family in Biełavuša (now Stolin Raion in Brest Voblast), West Belarus.

In 1943 the young Ivan Brucki was sent by the Nazis to Germany as an ostarbeiter. Having avoided repatriation in 1947, Ivan Brucki graduated from a gymnasium in Hannover.  He then immigrated to Canada and participated there in the local Belarusian social and life and in the parish life of the Belarusian Autocephalous Orthodox Church.

In 1962, he immigrated to the U.S. and became an active member in different political and religious organizations in Cleveland and Detroit.

As a member of the Belarusian Autocephalous Orthodox Church and an active member of the community, he was delegated to the Church Council (Sabor) of this jurisdiction which took place in May 1972 in Highland Park, New Jersey.

In 1979, he was ordained to the diaconate and later that same year to the priesthood. He graduated from the St. Sophia Ukrainian Orthodox Theological Seminary in 1981. Then, by the hierarchs of the Belarusian Autocephalous Orthodox Church and Ukrainian Autocephalous Orthodox Church he was consecrated to the rank of bishop.
Shortly after that, he become archbishop and in 1984, Archbishop Iziasłaŭ  was elevated to the rank of metropolitan and elected to be the Primate of the Belarusian Autocephalous Orthodox Church.

1926 births
2007 deaths
People from Stolin District
People from Polesie Voivodeship
Eastern Orthodox Christians from Belarus
American people of Belarusian descent
Eastern Orthodox metropolitans
Primates of independent Eastern Orthodox churches